A  is a heraldic crown seen in Germany after the First World War. When the German monarchy had been overthrown following the defeat in the war, this crown was created to replace the old coronets of rank in the arms of the German , the states of the German federative republic. The crown is made of vine leaves.

In the 1920s, all of the German states used the people's crown but after the Second World War only a few of them have chosen to retain its use.

See also 
 
 Mural crown 

Crowns in heraldry
German heraldry